Rajeev Bikram Shah is a Nepalese politician. He was elected as a member of Constituent Assembly from second Constitutional Assembly election held on 19 November 2013 from Jajarkot Constituency No. 2. He is the president of Nepal Amateur Athletic Association. In the 2017 Nepalese legislative election he was candidate from Jajarkot constituency No. 1.

See also 
List of Nepalese politicians

References

1968 births
Living people
People from Jajarkot District
People from Kathmandu District
Nepalese businesspeople
Nepali Congress politicians from Karnali Province
Members of the 2nd Nepalese Constituent Assembly
Members of the Provincial Assembly of Karnali Province